"First Sorrow" (German: "Erstes Leid") is a short story by Franz Kafka probably written between the fall of 1921 and the spring of 1922. It appeared in Kurt Wolff Verlag's art periodical Genius, III no. 2 (dated 1921, actually published in 1922) and in the Christmas 1923 supplement to the Prager Presse. The story was also included in the collection A Hunger Artist (Ein Hungerkünstler) published by Verlag Die Schmiede soon after Kafka's death.

Plot outline
The story concerns a trapeze artist who wants to remain on his trapeze at all times, and never come down to the ground. He is faced with difficulties when the circus he belongs to must travel from place to place. The trapeze artist is said to be dedicated solely to perfecting his art. The theatrical group and the manager do not object to this as they proceed to accommodate his every demand, which Kafka notes is never refused. As such, when the artist does travel, he is said to get his own accommodation: for in-town shows, he is taken to performances in a race car so as to not prolong his sufferings, or, if travelling by train, a whole compartment is reserved and he travels atop the luggage. Upon arrival, the artist takes his place, hanging aloft the trapeze. Even during the performances of the theatrical group, he remains in public view but remains perfectly still.

One day, as the group travels to another destination, the trapeze artist captures his manager's attention with a barely audible voice that is about to ask a question. The manager is immediately all attention and the artist tells the manager that in the future he would prefer to have a second trapeze. The manager agrees with the idea but it is not one that would have been otherwise refused. At this moment, however, the trapeze artist bursts into tears and says "Only the one bar in my hand--how can I go on living!" (448). The manager then assures him that he will get his second trapeze and the artist returns to his place atop the luggage and sleeps. But the manager now worries about the future of the artist as he has, for the first time, begun to question the nature of the art that is his profession: "Once such ideas began to torment him, would they ever quite leave him alone? Would they not threaten his very existence? And indeed the manager believed he could see, during the apparently peaceful sleep which had succeeded the fit furrows of care engraving themselves upon the trapeze artist's smooth, childlike forehead" (ibid).

Publication history (in English)
 1937; as "First Grief", translated by Lilian F. Turner, "Life and Letters", Summer 1937, pp. 57-59.
 1948; translated by Willa and Edwin Muir, in The Penal Colony, New York, Schocken Books, 320 p.

References

1922 short stories
Short stories by Franz Kafka